NGC 1961 (also known as IC 2133) is a spiral galaxy in the constellation Camelopardalis. It is at a distance of circa 200 million light years from Earth, which, given its apparent dimensions, means that NGC 1961 is more than 220,000 light years across. The galaxy has been distorted, however no companion has been detected nor double nuclei that could show a recent merger. Its outer arms are highly irregular. Two long straight arms extent from the north side of the galaxy. A luminous X-ray corona has been detected around the galaxy. NGC 1961 is the central member of the small group of nine galaxies, the NGC 1961 group.

It was discovered by William Herschel on December 3, 1788. Four supernovae have been observed in NGC 1961, SN 1998eb, SN 2001is, SN 2013cc, and SN 2021vaz.

Gallery

References

External links 

Unbarred spiral galaxies
Camelopardalis (constellation)
Luminous infrared galaxies
1961
IC objects
03334
17625
184